The NS 3700 class was a class of express steam locomotives with the wheel arrangement of 2'C (4-6-0) of Nederlandse Spoorwegen (NS) and its predecessor Maatschappij tot Exploitatie van Staatsspoorwegen (SS).

History

The first 109 locomotives of this series were delivered to the SS between 1910 - 1920 and numbered 685 - 778 and 785 - 799. The manufacturers were Beyer, Peacock & Company (36 engines), Werkspoor (48 engines), Hanomag (10 engines) and Henschel & Son (15 engines). After the merger of the SS and the HSM in 1921, six more locomotives were delivered by Werkspoor in that same year. The series was then given the NS numbers 3701–3815. In 1928 another order of five locomotives were ordered from Schwarzkopff and built to a slightly altered design. The whole classed was numbered between 3701 - 3820 after the last once were added to the fleet.

The Noord-Brabantsch-Duitsche Spoorweg-Maatschappij (NBDS) was the first railway company in the Netherlands to use express locomotives with the wheel arrangement 2'C (4-6-0) in 1908 (NBDS 30–35, later NS 3500). They achieved good results with them, they asked the SS to test one of these locomotives on the line between Amsterdam and Emmerich. This test was a great success, after seeing how successful the locomotives were the SS also bought 2'C (4-6-0) express locomotives. The NBDS locomotives only had two inside cylinders, the SS opted for a locomotive with four cylinders.

The locomotives were designed by the SS, looking to British locomotive design for inspiration, for pulling (express)passenger trains. Compared to the SS series 801 - 935 (NS 1701 - 1835), the NS 3700 class had twice the amount of power, and were therefore nicknamed "Jumbo". This series quickly became important for pulling trains in the Netherlands. They had to hand over their heaviest express trains to their stronger brothers of the NS 3900 class after 1929. After they experienced problems with the new Mat'34 that was supposed to provide fast connections between the major cities, they used a locomotive of the NS 3700 class to replace them. With these so-called steam diesels services, speeds of more than 120 km/h were achieved.

The locomotives of the NS 3700 class had either a three- or four-axle tender to carry the necessary amount of coal and water. In 1929 a tank engines version ("Tender jumbos") appeared with a wheel arrangement of 2'C2' (4-6-4) as the NS 6100 series. Ten of these locomotives were built (five locomotives were built by Hohenzollern and the other five by Werkspoor). A lighter tank engine was previously built by Beyer, Peacock & Company with only two inside cylinders and a slightly smaller boiler, the NS 6000 series.

Locomotive 3737 
Locomotive 3737, built in 1911 as SS 731 by Werkspoor, made its first test run between Amsterdam and Utrecht on 28 August 1911. She officially entered service on the 11th of September 1911. Locomotive 3737 (allocated to Roosendaal shed) ran the last official NS steam hauled service from Geldermalsen to Utrecht Maliebaan on the 7th of January 1958, where the Spoorwegmuseum was already located at that time. The locomotive 3737 was subsequently included in the collection of the museum.

In the 1970s, the NS 3737 was overhauled to be used for special rail tours. In the 1974 and '75 steam seasons, the locomotive was leased to the Stichting Stoomtrein Tilburg-Turnhout (SSTT), which operated a tourist train service on a stretch of the Tilburg - Turnhout railway line. The NS 3737 played an important role in the anniversary celebration of 150 years of Railways in the Netherlands in 1989. In the years that followed, the locomotive, has occasionally been active on the railway network. In 1996 she got a completely new boiler with a new firebox. The intention was to use the locomotive on a regular basis, but it broke down after a few runs. When an overhaul was needed in 2008, the Railway Museum announced that it wanted to use part of a subsidy received from the BankGiro Lottery for this, but at the end of 2008 the amount turned out to be insufficient.

Gallery

The NS 3700 as a model
The NS 3700 class was released by some Dutch model train manufacturers in scales H0 and 0, first as an expensive handmade brass model by Philotrain and since 2010 as a cheaper production model in H0 scale by Artitec. This has marketed virtually all variants of from the SS and NS in all analogue and digital power types. Some adjustments had to be made because the curves in the model are much tighter than in reality.

References

Sources
 Paul Henken: Stoomlocomotieven Serie SS 685-799 (NS 3700). De geschiedenis van de Jumbo's. Uquilair, Rosmalen, 2001. 
 Paul Henken: Stoomlocomotieven NS-serie 6100. De geschiedenis van de Tenderjumbo's. Uquilair, Rosmalen, 2002. 
 R.C. Statius Muller, A.J. Veenendaal jr., H. Waldorp: De Nederlandse stoomlocomotieven. De Alk, Alkmaar, 2005. 
Het Utrechts Archief

External links

 Photo of the derailed locomotive 3708 in Woerden on October 15, 1936
 Locomotive 3737 on the Dutch Museum Database
 Audio recording of a NS 3700 with passenger train from Amsterdam C.S. in 1955

Steam locomotives of the Netherlands
Berliner locomotives
Werkspoor locomotives
Henschel locomotives
Hanomag locomotives
Beyer, Peacock locomotives
Dutch railway-related lists
4-6-0 locomotives
Maatschappij tot Exploitatie van Staatsspoorwegen